WSAL 1230 AM/ 94.9 FM is a radio station broadcasting a format consisting News-Talk and Sports as well as Adult standards music. The station is licensed to Logansport, Indiana, and is owned by James Allan Schliemann, through licensee Iron Horse Broadcasting, LLC. Music programming comes from Westwood One's America's Best Music format. WSAL's most popular program is Talk of the Town, featuring community happenings each morning from 9-10 a.m.

References

External links
WSAL's webpage

SAL